Shine is a 2020 young adult romance novel by Korean-American singer Jessica Jung, published by Simon & Schuster on September 29 2020. Jung, a former member of the South Korean girl-group Girls' Generation, was inspired to write the book based on her experiences in the Korean music industry. Jung was clear that the book is fiction, not an "autobiography or a tell-all story", but also said that it could "be like an Easter egg hunt ... looking for clues and who’s who, what’s what, what’s true, what’s not."

A sequel,  Bright, was released on May 10 2022.

Plot 
Seventeen-year-old Rachel Kim is a trainee at DB Entertainment, a prominent K-pop company. The atmosphere at DB is highly competitive due to the instructors' high standards and the knowledge that only a small minority of trainees will ever be chosen to debut as a DB performer. Rachel is bullied by her fellow trainees due to her Korean-American background and because she lives with her family rather than in the trainee dormitories. Chief among the bullies is Choo Mina, a wealthy trainee who hates Rachel for several etiquette violations she accidentally insulted Mina with years ago. Rachel also faces opposition from her mother, Umma, who believes that k-pop training is distracting her too much from the rest of her life and future.

After a chance encounter with DB boy-group singer Jason Lee, Rachel becomes attracted to him. Rachel is drugged by Mina at a party and arrives late to a trainee evaluation the next morning. DB CEO Mr. Noh announces that the best female trainee will be chosen to release a duet song with Jason, but Rachel flubs the evaluation and vomits on an amused Jason. Mina is chosen for the duet.

Rachel meets with her mentor, DB executive Chung Yujin, and concocts a plan to restore face by recording a video of her singing with Jason and then anonymously leaking it to the public. Yujin takes Rachel to an underground café for celebrities, where she meets DB singer Kang Jina and sings with Jason. The "leaked" video goes viral and Rachel begs Mr. Noh for a second chance; he declares that both she and Mina will record the song with Jason.

Rachel goes on several secretive dates with Jason, despite DB forbidding performers from dating, and the two fall in love. When Umma is sent a video by Mina of Rachel drugged at the party, she threatens to pull Rachel from DB. Rachel angrily retorts that Umma has never supported her enough despite the huge pressures of training. Umma tells Rachel that if she is not chosen to debut before the next company tour in a few months, she will not be allowed to keep training.

Kang Jina announces that she will not renew her contract with DB, and the press portrays her as a diva who had become spoiled by the luxuries of stardom. While on a date with Jason, Rachel runs into a drunken Jina, who reveals that she was actually fired for violating the no-dating rule. A shaken Rachel breaks off her relationship with Jason.

The song recorded by Mina, Rachel and Jason is extremely successful and the three are sent on an interview tour. Rachel and Mina bond during the tour, but when Mina falls and injures herself while wearing shoes borrowed from Rachel, she accuses the latter of sabotaging her and they return to enmity. Meanwhile, Rachel is still attracted to Jason, and eventually rekindles their romance.

After the tour, images of Rachel and Jason dating are leaked to the press, but so are images of Mina and Jason dating. Rachel learns that both relationships were orchestrated by DB to garner attention for Jason, who plans to leave his group and start a  solo career. Jason is portrayed by the media as a heartbroken innocent caught between two loves, and his first solo release is a great success. Rachel learns that Mina and Jason were aware of the entire situation, but the secret was kept from her due to her poor acting skills. Jason tells Rachel he genuinely loves her, but she tearfully breaks up with him. Rachel almost leaves DB, but decides to stay after being encouraged by Umma, who reveals that she was a competitive athlete in her youth and struggled with lack of approval from her own mother.

Rachel is chosen as the lead singer of Girls Forever, DB's next girl-group. Mina, chosen as lead dancer, reveals that she has a video of Rachel and Jason kissing outside of the DB-arranged dates, and holds it over Rachel's head as blackmail. Rachel endures further bullying from Mina and the rest of Girls Forever during the group training, but manages to destroy Mina's phone in a glass of water right before the group's debut performance.

Reception 
The book was a New York Times Bestseller, debuting at #5 on the Young Adult Hardcover list. Kirkus Reviews called it "[a] fast-paced, entertaining romp" and praised its use of Korean words and references.

Notes

References 

2020 American novels
American young adult novels
Korean-American novels
Literature by Asian-American women
Simon & Schuster books